Hillsman is a surname. Notable people with the surname include:

Bill Hillsman (born 1953), American political consultant and advertising executive
Don Hillsman II, American penciller and inker
Quentin Hillsman (born 1970), American college basketball coach
William Hilsman (politician), American politician